Prole or proles may refer to:

 A member of the proletariat, a lower social class, or the working class
 Prole, Iowa, a community in the midwestern United States
 Próle, a village in Poland
 Proles, a synonym for race in biological taxonomy